Microdon tristis is a species of syrphid fly in the family Syrphidae.

References

Microdontinae
Articles created by Qbugbot
Insects described in 1864